The 1905 Tennessee Volunteers football team represented the University of Tennessee in the 1905 Southern Intercollegiate Athletic Association football season.  James DePree, a University of Michigan grad, served the first of his two seasons as head coach at Tennessee. This was the Volunteers' first season without a win in Southern Intercollegiate Athletic Association play since 1897.

Schedule

References

Tennessee
Tennessee Volunteers football seasons
Tennessee Volunteers football